KIDX (101.5 FM, "The Kid") is a radio station licensed to serve Ruidoso, New Mexico, United States. The station, established in 2000, is owned by MTD Radio Inc.

KIDX broadcasts a classic rock music format featuring the satellite-fed "The Classic Rock Experience" service from Citadel Media.

History
This station received its original construction permit from the Federal Communications Commission on April 21, 2000.  The new station was assigned the KIDX call sign by the FCC on May 8, 2000.  KIDX received its license to cover from the FCC on June 23, 2000.

References

External links
KIDX official website
MTD Radio Inc.

IDX
Lincoln County, New Mexico
Classic rock radio stations in the United States
Radio stations established in 2000